Ogaridiscus is a genus of air-breathing land snails, terrestrial pulmonate gastropod mollusks in the family Zonitidae.

Species
Only one species—with no subspecies—is listed in the Catalog of Life:
 Ogaridiscus subrupicola

References

Zonitidae
Gastropod genera